Miss Venezuela 2002 was the 49th Miss Venezuela pageant, was held in Caracas, Venezuela, on September 20, 2002, after weeks of events.  The winner of the pageant was Mariangel Ruiz, Miss Aragua.

The pageant was broadcast live on Venevision from the Poliedro de Caracas in Caracas, Venezuela. At the conclusion of the final night of competition, outgoing titleholder Cynthia Lander crowned Mariangel Ruiz of Aragua as the new Miss Venezuela.

Results

(*) Goizeder Azua (Carabobo) was crowned Miss World Venezuela 2002 during the Gala de Belleza (Preliminary) show, on August 31, 2002.  The title of Miss Carabobo was then vacated for the final Miss Venezuela 2002 competition.

Special awards
 Miss Photogenic (voted by press reporters) - Vanessa Fanessi (Yaracuy)
 Miss Internet (voted by www.missvenezuela.com viewers) - Maria Fernanda León (Portuguesa)
 Miss Congeniality (voted by Miss Venezuela contestants) - Goizeder Azua (Carabobo)
 Miss Figure - Amara Barroeta (Distrito Capital)
 Miss Personality - Goizeder Azua (Carabobo)
 Best Hair - Maria Andreina Abrahamz (Vargas)
 Best Smile - Vanessa Fanessi (Yaracuy)
 Best Face - Maria Fernanda León (Portuguesa)
 Best Runway - Goizeder Azua (Carabobo)
 Best Skin - Aida Yespica (Amazonas)

Delegates
The Miss Venezuela 2002 delegates are:

Notes
Mariangel Ruiz placed as 1st runner up in Miss Universe 2003 in Panama City, Panama.
Goizeder Azua placed as semifinalist in Miss World 2002 in London, England. She won Miss International 2003 in Tokyo, Japan, and won Miss Mesoamérica 2003 in Houston, Texas, United States.
Ana Quintero placed as 1st runner up in Miss Intercontinental 2003 in Berlin, Germany.
Vanessa Fanesi placed as 1st runner up in Miss Italia Nel Mondo 2003 in Salsomaggiore, Italy. She previously won Miss Millennium 2000 in Helsinki, Finland, and placed 1st runner up in Miss Tourism World 2001 in Medellín, Colombia.
María Carolina Casado won Miss América Latina 2003 in Playa Tambor, Puntarenas, Costa Rica.
Karelit Yépez placed as 4th runner up in Miss Model of the World 2002 in Istanbul, Turkey.
Maria Fernanda León (Portuguesa) had previously competed in 1999 as Miss Guarico, no placement.  She later placed as finalist in Miss Teen International 2001 in Willemstad, Curaçao.

References

External links
Miss Venezuela official website

2002 in Venezuela
2002 beauty pageants